Ilha do Cardoso (Cardoso Island) is an island belonging to the city of Cananéia, São Paulo, Brazil. It is the southernmost point of the state of São Paulo, near the border with the state of Paraná. The island is protected by the Ilha do Cardoso State Park, which protects the Atlantic Forest biome.

References

Atlantic islands of Brazil